Kirill Martynychev (born 5 May 2002) is a Russian swimmer. He competed in the 2020 Summer Olympics.

References

2002 births
Living people
Swimmers from Saint Petersburg
Russian male freestyle swimmers
Olympic swimmers of Russia
Swimmers at the 2020 Summer Olympics